Maoism–Third Worldism (MTW) is a broad tendency which is mainly concerned with the infusion and synthesis of Marxism—particularly of the Marxist–Leninist–Maoist persuasion—with concepts of non-Marxist Third Worldism, namely dependency theory and world-systems theory.

There is no general consensus on part of Maoist–Third Worldists as a whole. However, the majority of proponents typically argue for the centrality of anti-imperialism to the victory of global communist revolution as well as against the idea that the working class in the First World is majority-exploited (sometimes arguing that it experiences no exploitation at all) and therefore it is not a part of the international  proletariat.

In academic discourse, Maoism–Third Worldism is sometimes synonymous with dependency theory or dependencism.

Theory 
Maoism–Third Worldism is theoretically defined by a variety of political principles which emphasize the enormous economic, social and political divisions which exist currently between the "overdeveloped" First World and the "underdeveloped" Third World. This is expressed through the lens of Maoist theory and practice, but brought into a new international understanding of imperialism and class in the context of the world which has been divided into two distinct camps, namely the exploited countries (the Third World) and their exploiters (the First World). According to the Revolutionary Anti-Imperialist Movement (RAIM), on the question of the principal theoretical observations of Maoism–Third Worldism they state: Confronted by a complacent working class, served by an opportunist left, and alienated from the proletariat through the reception of surplus value drained from the Third World, we must understand the ideological and strategic implications of struggle from within the parasitic core. It benefits neither the left in the oppressor or the oppressed nations to pretend that the condition of the working class around the world is the same... To be a Third Worldist, in our view, is to be a principled internationalist.

Global people's war 
However, the foundations of Maoism–Third Worldism extend to encapsulate a great many strategic and theoretical developments in Marxist theory over the 20th century. Among them is the understanding of a global people's war being necessary as a military strategy for bringing an end to the historically unequal relationship built between the First and Third Worlds. This strategy includes the systematic delinking of the exploited economies of Third World countries from the parasitic First World and the unification of international forces to deprive the imperialist countries of resources and wealth extracted from Third World countries.

Though this strategy has been drawn from several historical sources such as Che Guevara's Message to the Tri-Continental, it has most famously drawn on a quote from Lin Biao's speech Long Live the Victory of People's War! in 1965: Taking the entire globe, if North America and Western Europe can be called 'the cities of the world', then Asia, Africa and Latin America constitute 'the rural areas of the world'. Since World War II, the proletarian revolutionary movement has for various reasons been temporarily held back in the North American and West European capitalist countries, while the people’s revolutionary movement in Asia, Africa and Latin America has been growing vigorously. In a sense, the contemporary world revolution also presents a picture of the encirclement of cities by the rural areas. In the final analysis, the whole cause of world revolution hinges on the revolutionary struggles of the Asian, African and Latin American peoples who make up the overwhelming majority of the world’s population. The socialist countries should regard it as their internationalist duty to support the people’s revolutionary struggles in Asia, Africa and Latin America.

Joint-dictatorship of the proletariat of oppressed nations 
Also fundamental to Maoism–Third Worldism is an understanding of the joint-dictatorship of the proletariat of oppressed nations (JDPON) and/or global new democratic revolution (GNDR) which is proposed as a form of alter-globalization aimed at breaking the political and economic foundations of the economic parasitism between the First and Third Worlds. The JDPON is a point of relative contention between the various proponents of Maoism–Third Worldism or at least the tendencies which have now been named as falling generally under the Third Worldist tendency within Marxism. In their cardinal principles, the Revolutionary Anti-Imperialist Movement (RAIM), describes the JDPON as such: The necessary political strategy for world revolution to accompany the GPPW must result in the establishment of a Joint-Dictatorship of the Proletariat of Oppressed Nations (JDPON). Throughout the history of world imperialism there has been a massive accumulation of wealth in the core imperialist countries of the First World. We understand that to move forward in the hope of Communism without reconciling the vast division of wealth and labor between the First and Third Worlds can only produce social imperialism; Communism cannot be built over the hoards of stolen wealth in the core, to advance this contradiction must be resolved. To resolve this, and to sew together those movements who should coalesce in the global strategy of Global Protracted People’s War, we must have a Global New Democratic Revolution, in which a coalition toward the alter-globalization of the world is formed from the cooperation of the Proletarian and Progressive states of the oppressed countries, under the leadership of the Proletariat, to guide the revolutionary forces toward the defeat of imperialism. As well, to promote revolutionary consciousness and catalyze the development toward the JDPON: the global settling of accounts through which the means of production of the core countries are internationalized and their wealth is redistributed to those countries which have been historically robbed. It is through this process of JDPON that the contradiction between oppressor/oppressed nations is resolved and the oppressor countries are integrated into the world socialist project.

However, the concept of the JDPON has also existed for quite a while longer than the RAIM and was first formalized in its contemporary form by the Maoist Internationalist Movement (MIM) in their article on the dictatorship of the proletariat: Because there is no exploited white working class in North Amerika, MIM favors the joint dictatorship of the proletariat of the oppressed nations (JDPON). This amounts to putting u.$. imperialism into receivership by something like a proletarian United Nations. The whole dictatorship of the proletariat idea or its current form required as JDPON is a strategy for advance from capitalism toward communism, in which dictatorship is only a stage existing until certain tasks eliminating classes are done.

Organisations 
The Maoism–Third Worldism movement is currently mostly associated with organizations such as the Revolutionary Anti-Imperialist Movement and Maoist Internationalist Ministry of Prisons, a branch-off from the Maoist Internationalist Movement (MIM), a now defunct organisation). However, MIM Prisons considers its ideology to be MIM Thought and not Maoist–Third Worldist. ANTICONQUISTA, an anti-imperialist media collective, upholds Third Worldist views.

See also 
 Non-Aligned Movement
 Third-Worldism
 Third World socialism
 Three Worlds Theory
 Settlers: The Mythology of the White Proletariat

References

Further reading 
 Accumulation On A World Scale, Samir Amin.
 Back on Track: The Object of Third Worldism, Klaas V.
 Divided World, Divided Class: Global Political Economy & The Stratification Of Labour Under Capitalism, Zak Cope.
 Eurocentrism and the Communist Movement, Robert Biel.
 Foreign Trade and the Law of Value, Part I, Anwar Shaikh.
 Foreign Trade and the Law of Value, Part II, Anwar Shaikh.
 Imperialism & Unequal Development, Samir Amin.
 The Law Of Worldwide Value (Second Edition), Samir Amin.
 Long Live the Victory of People’s War!, Lin Biao.
 Message to the Tricontinental (Two, Three, Many Vietnams), Che Guevara.
 Unequal Exchange and the Prospects of Socialism, Communist Working Group.
 Unequal Exchange, a Study of the Imperialism of Trade, Arghiri Emmanuel.
 Unequal Development: An Essay on the Social Formations of Peripheral Capitalism, Samir Amin.
 Settlers, the Mythology of the White Proletariat, J. Sakai.
 The Worker Elite: Notes on the “Labor Aristocracy”, Bromma.

Maoism
Political theories
Third-Worldism
Imperialism studies